Tankwa Karoo National Park is a national park in South Africa. The park lies about 70 km due west of Sutherland near the border of the Northern Cape and Western Cape, in one of the most arid regions of South Africa, with areas receiving less than 100 mm of average annual precipitation, moisture-bearing clouds from the Atlantic Ocean being largely stopped by the Cederberg mountains. Other low areas receive little more, as the Roodewerf station (co-ordinates: S32°14’27.9” E20°05’44.5”) with 180 mm of mean annual rainfall. In the hottest areas of the park, the mean maximum temperature in January is 38.9 °C, and in July the mean minimum temperature ranges from about 5 to 7 °C. Before this Park's proclamation, the only protected area of Succulent Karoo was the 2 square kilometre patch of the Gamkaberg Nature Reserve. Succulent Karoo has, together with the Cape Floral Kingdom, been declared a Biodiversity Hotspot by Conservation International.

Tankwa's area has been increased from an initial 260 to 1436 km2. It is bounded on the east by the Roggeveld Mountains, on the west by the Cederberg, to the north by the Kouebokkeveld Mountains and on the south by the scattered foothills of the Koedoesberge and Klein Roggeveld Mountains, and the Tankwa River. The park's headquarters are located at Roodewerf (GPS co-ordinates: S 32° 14’ 27.9” E 20° 5’ 44.5”). Distances from the nearest towns to the park's headquarters are: Ceres (180 km), Sutherland (120 km), Calvinia (110 km) and Middelpos (52 km).

In 1998 Conrad Strauss sold 280 km2 of sheep farm to the South African National Parks. The park has started the reintroduction of game that used to be found naturally in the area. Research was done beforehand to ensure that introduced animals would survive on the overgrazed veld. The vegetation in the park falls within the Succulent Karoo biome and has been described as very sparse shrubland and dwarf shrubland. Several unique succulent genera occur here, such as Tanquana, Braunsia and Didymaotus. The park is home to a large variety of birds (188 species – 2015 figure), such as the black-headed canary, Ludwig's bustard, and the black-eared sparrow-lark. Peak birding season is August to October.

List of mammals

Aardvark/Antbear (Orycteropus afer)
Aardwolf (Proteles cristatus)
Southern African wildcat (Felis lybica)
Bat-eared fox (Otocyon megalotis)
Black-backed jackal (Canis mesomelas)
Cape fox (Vulpes chama)
Cape golden mole (Chrysochloris asiatica)
Cape hare (Lepus capensis)
Caracal (Felix caracal)
Chacma baboon (Papio cynocephalus ursinus)
Four-striped grass mouse (Rhabdomys pumilio)
Gerbil mouse (Malacothrix typica)
Grey duiker (Sylvicapra grimmia)
Grey rhebok (Palea capreolus)
House mouse (Mus domesticus)
Karoo bush rat (Otomys unisulcatis)
Klipspringer (Oreotragus oreotragus)
Kudu (Tragelaphus strepsiceros')
Leopard (Panthera pardus)
Meerkat (Suricata suricatta)
Cape porcupine (Hystrix africaeaustralis)
Ratel/honey badger (Mellivora capensis)
Rock dassie/rock hyrax (Procavia capensis)
Scrub hare (Lepus saxatilis)
Small-spotted genet (Genetta genetta)
Brown hyena (Parahyaena Brunnea)
Springbok (Antidorcas marsupialis)
Steenbok (Raphicerus campestris)
Striped polecat/zorilla (Ictonyx striatus)
Yellow mongoose (Cynictis penicillata'')

List of birds
The Park's bird list currently includes 187 bird species. Birds found in the park include:

Acacia pied barbet
African black swift
African hoopoe
African pied starling
African pipit
African red-eyed bulbul
Common reed warbler
African snipe
Alpine swift
Avocet
Barn owl
Barn swallow
Black-chested snake eagle
Black-eared sparrow-lark
Black harrier
Black-headed canary
Blacksmith lapwing
Black stork
Black-winged stilt
Bokmakierie
Booted eagle
Brown-throated martin
Burchell's courser
Cape bulbul
Cape bunting
Cape clapper lark
Cape crow
Cape penduline tit
Cape shoveler
Cape siskin
Cape sparrow
Cape spurfowl
Cape turtle dove
Cape wagtail
Cape weaver
Capped wheatear
Chestnut-vented warbler
Southern fiscal
Common quail
Common waxbill
Double-banded courser
Dusky sunbird
Egyptian goose
European bee-eater
European starling
Fairy flycatcher
Familiar chat
Greater flamingo
Greater honeyguide
Greater kestrel
Greater striped swallow
Grey-backed cisticola
Grey-backed sparrow-lark
Grey heron
Grey tit
Grey-winged francolin
Hadeda ibis
Helmeted guineafowl
House sparrow
Jackal buzzard
Karoo bustard
Karoo chat
Karoo eremomela
Karoo lark
Karoo long-billed lark
Karoo prinia
Karoo scrub-robin
Karoo thrush
Kittlitz's plover
Kori bustard
Lanner falcon
Large-billed lark
Lark-like bunting
Laughing dove
Layard's tit-babbler
Lesser honeyguide
Lesser kestrel
Little swift
Long-billed crombec
Nicholson's pipit
Ludwig's bustard
Malachite sunbird
Marsh sandpiper
Martial eagle
Mountain wheatear
Namaqua dove
Namaqua sandgrouse
Namaqua warbler
Nicholson's pipit
Pale-winged starling
Peregrine falcon
Pied crow
Pririt batis
Red-billed teal
Red-capped lark
Red-faced mousebird
Red-knobbed coot
Rock kestrel
Rock martin
Rufous-eared warbler
Secretarybird
Sickle-winged chat
South African shelduck
Southern double-collared sunbird
Southern grey-headed sparrow
Southern masked weaver
Pale chanting goshawk
Southern red bishop
Speckled pigeon
Spike-heeled lark
Spotted eagle owl
Spotted thick-knee
Steppe buzzard
Three-banded plover
Tractrac chat
Verreaux's eagle
Wattled starling
White-backed mousebird
White-necked raven
White-rumped swift
White-throated canary
Willow warbler
Yellow-bellied eremomela
Yellow-billed kite
Yellow canary

References

External links
South African National Parks
Tankwa Karoo birding
Tankwa Karoo birdlist
Visit South Africa

Protected areas established in 1986
National parks of South Africa
Protected areas of the Northern Cape
1986 establishments in South Africa